Thyestes was the mythical king of Olympia. 

Thyestes may also refer to:
 Thyestes (Euripides), a lost play of Euripides
 Thyestes (Seneca), a Roman tragedy
 Mount Thyestes, in Canada
 Thyestes (fish), a genus of fossil fish
 14792 Thyestes, an asteroid

See also
 Thyestes Chase, a National Hunt handicap steeplechase run in Ireland